Lago di Fiastra is a reservoir in the province of Macerata in the Marche region of Italy. It was created in 1955. The Fiastrone flows into the reservoir from the south and exits the reservoir in the northeast part of the lake. The lake is located within Monti Sibillini National Park.

References

Lakes of the Marche